,  which means rice with artificial meat, is a North Korean dish, made of rice, kimchi, soy bean paste and soy bean oil. It is made by wrapping steamed rice in a light skin made from leftover soybean paste and dressed with a chili sauce. This creates a meat-like texture.

Injo-gogi-bap was created during the North Korean famine, which lasted from 1994 to 1998.

See also
Crab stick

References

North Korean cuisine
Rice dishes
Imitation foods
Soy-based foods
Street food